Quo Vadis, Aida? ( Where are you going, Aida?) is a 2020 internationally co-produced war drama film written, produced and directed by Jasmila Žbanić. An international co-production of twelve production companies, the film was shown in the main competition section of the 77th Venice International Film Festival. It was nominated for Best International Feature Film at the 93rd Academy Awards and won the Award for Best Film at the 34th European Film Awards.

Plot 
The film dramatizes the events of the Srebrenica massacre, during which Serbian troops sent Bosniak men and boys to death in July 1995 led by Serbian convicted war criminal Ratko Mladić. Named for its protagonist, Quo Vadis, Aida? exposes the events through the eyes of a mother named Aida, a schoolteacher who works with the United Nations as a translator. After three and a half years under siege, the town of Srebrenica, close to the northeastern Serbian border, was declared a UN safety zone in 1993 and put under the protection of a Dutch battalion working for the UN.

Cast

Release
The film had its world premiere at the 77th Venice International Film Festival on 3 September 2020. It was also screened at the 2020 Toronto International Film Festival on 13 September 2020. In February 2021, Super LTD acquired U.S. distribution rights to the film. It was released in the United States through virtual cinema on 5 March 2021, followed by video on demand on 15 March 2021.

Reception

Critical response
The critics consensus on the website states: "Quo Vadis, Aida? uses one woman's heartbreaking conflict to offer a searing account of war's devastating human toll." According to Metacritic, the film received "universal acclaim" based on a weighted average score of 97 out of 100 from 16 critic reviews. It was declared Metacritic's Official Best Movie of 2021 and Best International Movie of 2021.

Ryan Gilbey of New Statesman stated "Žbanić has shaped the factual into an eloquent and conscientious picture that purrs along as suspensefully as any ticking-bomb thriller, using Ðuričić's performance as its engine". Jude Dry of IndieWire wrote that "Žbanić lays bare the deeply human toll of violence and war", and Peter Bradshaw wrote in The Guardian that "after 25 years, the time has come to look again at the horror of Srebrenica, and Žbanić has done this with clear-eyed compassion and candor".

Jessica Kiang for Variety states that "this is not historical revisionism, if anything, Quo Vadis, Aida? works to un-revise history, re-centering the victims’ plight as the eye of a storm of evils — not only the massacre itself, but the broader evils of institutional failure and international indifference". Kevin Maher writes in The Times that "it's incendiary, furiously committed film-making from the director Jasmila Žbanić, who also adds an unnerving ending about the burden that Srebrenica survivors still bear."

Other critics underline the film's ambiguous ending. "The final act of “Quo Vadis, Aida” [...] makes clear that many other perpetrators escaped with impunity," writes film critic A. O. Scott in The New York Times. "The war ended, and some version of normalcy returned, but Žbanić takes no consolation in the banal observation that life goes on. It’s true that time passes, that memory fades, that history is a record of mercy as well as of savagery. But it’s also true — as this unforgettable film insists — that loss is permanent and unanswerable."

Accolades

In September 2020, Quo Vadis, Aida? was selected as the Bosnian entry for the Best International Feature Film at the 93rd Academy Awards, making the shortlist of fifteen films. On 15 March 2021, the film was officially recognized as a nominee in that category. It won the Audience Award at the 50th edition of the International Film Festival Rotterdam and the Best International Film Award at the 2021 Gothenburg Film Festival. The film was also nominated for and later on won the Best International Film Award at the 36th Independent Spirit Awards. In March 2021, 74th British Academy Film Awards nominated the film for Best Film Not in the English Language and Žbanić earned a nomination in the Best Director category.

In December 2021, Quo Vadis, Aida? won the Award for Best Film at the 34th European Film Awards. Also, Žbanić won the Award for Best Director and Jasna Đuričić won the Award for Best Actress at the same awards.

Awards

See also
 List of submissions to the 93rd Academy Awards for Best International Feature Film
 List of Bosnian submissions for the Academy Award for Best International Feature Film

References

External links
 
 

2020 films
2020 drama films
2020 multilingual films
2020 war drama films
Films directed by Jasmila Žbanić
Bosnia and Herzegovina war drama films
Bosnian-language films
Serbo-Croatian-language films
Romanian war drama films
Romanian multilingual films
Austrian multilingual films
Austrian war drama films
Dutch multilingual films
Dutch war drama films
German multilingual films
German war drama films
Polish multilingual films
Polish war drama films
French films based on actual events
French independent films
French multilingual films
French war drama films
Norwegian independent films
Norwegian multilingual films
Norwegian war drama films
Turkish multilingual films
Turkish war drama films
2020s English-language films
2020s Dutch-language films
Drama films based on actual events
War films based on actual events
Films based on actual events
Films about interpreting and translation
Films about Bosnian genocide
Srebrenica massacre
Films about the United Nations
Films set in 1995
Films set in Bosnia and Herzegovina
Cultural depictions of Ratko Mladić
Independent Spirit Award for Best Foreign Film winners
European Film Awards winners (films)
2020s French films